Bouy is a commune of the Marne department in northeastern France.

Population

International relations
Bouy is twinned with the English village of Everton in Nottinghamshire, UK.

See also
Communes of the Marne department

References

External links

Twinned with Everton, Nottinghamshire, UK
Facebook Page : Twinned with Everton, Nottinghamshire, UK

Communes of Marne (department)